Shreveport Regional Airport  is a public use airport in Shreveport, Louisiana, United States. It is owned by the City of Shreveport and located four nautical miles (7 km) southwest of its central business district.

The airport's runways and terminal are visible to traffic along Interstate 20, a main east–west corridor of the Southern United States. Shreveport Regional was designed to replace the Shreveport Downtown Airport, which limited growth due to its close proximity of the Red River.

The airport had 683,498 passengers in calendar year 2019. According to the FAA's National Plan of Integrated Airport Systems, it is a primary commercial service airport.

The FAA classifies Shreveport Regional Airport as a "Small Hub" airport. For the 2018 calendar year, Shreveport Regional Airport ranked just under Mobile Regional Airport (Mobile, Alabama) and Augusta Regional Airport (Augusta, Georgia) and just above Grand Canyon National Park Airport (Grand Canyon, Arizona) and Aspen-Pitkin County Airport (Aspen, Colorado) in total enplanements.

History
Historically, Shreveport was served by a number of airlines operating mainline jet service. Delta Air Lines was a major player at the airport for many years as Shreveport was a "focus city" and mini-hub for this air carrier. According to the February 1, 1976, edition of the Official Airline Guide (OAG), Delta was operating thirty-three (33) flights a day with Boeing 727-200 and McDonnell Douglas DC-9-30 jetliners from Shreveport. The December 15, 1979, Delta timetable lists ten (10) daily direct, no change of plane and nonstop jet services to Atlanta as well as daily nonstop jet flights to Dallas/Fort Worth, Houston, Little Rock, Birmingham, AL, Jackson, MS, Memphis, New Orleans, and Baton Rouge. This Delta timetable also lists one-stop, no change of plane direct jet service from Shreveport to New York–La Guardia Airport, Los Angeles, San Francisco, National (now known as Reagan National) Airport in Washington, D.C., Phoenix, Denver, Chicago, and St. Louis. Delta later operated Boeing 737 and McDonnell Douglas MD-80 jetliners from the airport as well. Northwest Airlines flew Douglas DC-9 jets nonstop to Memphis. Trans World Airlines (TWA) served the airport as well with Douglas DC-9 jet service to St. Louis. Other airlines that previously served Shreveport included the original Braniff International flying British Aircraft Corporation BAC One-Eleven jets followed by Boeing 727-200 jetliners nonstop to New Orleans and Fort Smith, AR, and also direct to Kansas City, Tulsa, Chicago and Minneapolis/St Paul. The original Frontier Airlines (1950-1986) also served Shreveport and operated Boeing 737-200 jetliners nonstop to Dallas/Fort Worth with direct, one-stop service to Denver. In the late 1970s Texas International Airlines serviced Shreveport with daily flights between Dallas and Texarkana using Convair 600 aircraft. In later years, American Airlines flew Boeing 727-200 and McDonnell Douglas MD-80 jet service nonstop to Dallas/Fort Worth while Continental Airlines operated Douglas DC-9 jets on nonstop flights to Houston. Now defunct Royale Airlines, a commuter airline, was based at the Shreveport Regional Airport from 1962 until 1989. It served 23 cities in Louisiana, Texas, Mississippi and Florida using Embraer EMB-110 Bandeirante, Beechcraft Model 99, Short 330, Grumman Gulfstream I and de Havilland Canada DHC-6 Twin Otter turboprops as well as Douglas DC-9-10 jetliners.

Facilities and aircraft
It has two asphalt paved runways: 14/32 is 8,348 by 200 feet (2,544 x 61 m) and 6/24 is 7,002 by 150 feet (2,134 × 46 m). The airport is located off Hollywood Avenue with access to Interstate 20. Shreveport Public Works Commissioner H. Lane Mitchell was a major figure in campaigning to have the airport located on Hollywood Ave.

In 2009, the airport opened a $30 million cargo terminal, which serves as an anchor for the Aero Park Industrial Park. Cargo tenants include United Parcel Service, FedEx, Integrated Airline Solutions, USA Jet, and Empire Airlines.

The recently renovated terminal now features wireless access and a restaurant between the two security checkpoints. The airport is also an alternate destination for American Airlines flights that cannot land at Dallas-Fort Worth Int'l and United Airlines that cannot land at Houston Intercontinental Airport due to bad weather. In June 2017, regional feeder ExpressJet Airlines closed their Shreveport-based Embraer regional jet aircraft maintenance hangar.

In 2018, Western Global Airlines created a consolidated maintenance center at Shreveport Regional to serve its growing fleet of 16 Boeing 747 and McDonnell-Douglas MD-11 aircraft. The airline moved into the former Expressjet facilities. The airline cited Shreveport's central location as the reason for the airport being selected. The facility took in its first Boeing 747 on August 17, 2018.

Shreveport Regional Airport was named the "2009 Louisiana Airport of the Year." This was Shreveport's third time winning this award.

Airlines and destinations
Currently, most airline services from Shreveport are flown with regional jet aircraft with the exception of flights operated by Allegiant Air which are operated with Airbus A320 Family jetliners. Delta Connection flies nonstop to Atlanta with Canadair CRJ-200 and CRJ-900 regional jets on behalf of Delta. American Eagle operating on behalf of American Airlines began flying four daily nonstop flights with Embraer E175 and Canadair CRJ 700 regional jet aircraft featuring first class and coach cabin service to Dallas/Fort Worth (DFW).  American Eagle also operates Embraer ERJ-145 regional jets to DFW and CRJ-700 aircraft to Charlotte.  United Express flights to Denver (DEN) and Houston (IAH) are both operated with ERJ-145 aircraft.

Passenger

Destinations map

Cargo

Statistics

Annual traffic

Annual passenger travel (enplanements + deplanements) at SHV, 2009–2022:

Top destinations

Airport operations and services

For the 12-month period ending December 31, 2021, the airport had 32,563 aircraft operations, an average of 89 per day: 25% air taxi, 37% general aviation, 30% air carrier and 8% military. At that time there were 62 aircraft based at this airport: 22 single-engine, 14 multi-engine, 24 jet and 2 helicopter.

Ground transportation service
The Shreveport Regional Airport has many options for transportation to and from the airport.

Rental car companies:
 Avis
 Budget
 Enterprise
 Hertz
 National
 Thrifty

Taxi and limo services:
 Action Taxi 	
 Ace Cabs, Inc. 	
 Yellow Checker Cab	
 VIP Taxi
 Shreveport Limousine

Rideshare:
 Uber
 Lyft

Public transportation is also available through SPORTRAN, Shreveport-Bossier's extensive public bus system.

The arts and the airport

Art at the Airport (Artport)
In 1990, the Airport Beautification Committee began a campaign to bring art and media to the Shreveport Regional Airport. Paintings, photographs, and projects by local school children decorate the lobby, hallways, and terminals of the airport. Officially known as Artport, the campaign declares itself "the only revolving public art display located in an airport setting in America, Artport features artwork from over 100 local and regional artists".

The Airport Beautification Committee hosts an annual gala-style event at the Shreveport Regional Airport showcasing local artists and raising funds for the program.

Louisiana film industry

Since Hurricane Katrina devastated much of New Orleans and south Louisiana in 2005, Shreveport has been home to the booming film industry in Louisiana. With production companies shooting films all over north Louisiana, the Shreveport Regional has seen growth in flights, passengers, air cargo operations, and even filming at the airport itself.

Requests can be made to film at the Shreveport Regional Airport. The airport boasts that it is "a proud supporter of the Shreveport-Bossier Film Industry" and that it has "a reputation for making production easy, with full support and streamlined paperwork."

The following is a list of productions shot at either Shreveport Regional or Shreveport Downtown airports:

Accidents and incidents
On January 10, 1954, a Grumman G-73 Mallard operated by Union Producing Comp crashed 10 miles SE of SHV during approach due to ice accumulation on the wings. Both crew members and all ten passengers were killed.

References

External links
 Shreveport Regional Airport
 
 

Airports in Louisiana
Buildings and structures in Shreveport, Louisiana
Airport